Tom Barry was an Australian professional rugby league footballer who played in the 1920s. He played in the New South Wales Rugby League (NSWRL).

Barry played for the South Sydney club in the years 1922-25 and the Eastern Suburbs club in 1927. In the 1923 premiership decider Barry played in the Centre's for Souths.

In 1925 season Barry represented New South Wales in two interstate matches against Queensland.

References

External links
The Encyclopedia of Rugby League; Alan Whiticker & Glen Hudson

1901 births
Year of death missing
Place of death missing
Australian rugby league players
Sydney Roosters players
New South Wales rugby league team players
South Sydney Rabbitohs players
Rugby league wingers
Rugby league centres